John Derek (born Derek Delevan Harris; August 12, 1926 – May 22, 1998) was an American actor, director, screenwriter, producer and photographer. He appeared in such films as Knock on Any Door, All the King's Men (both 1949), and Rogues of Sherwood Forest (1950).

Early life 
Derek Delevan Harris
 was born in Hollywood, California, on August 12, 1926, the son of actor/director Lawson Harris and actress Dolores Johnson.

Film career 
His good looks were soon noticed, and he was groomed for a movie career by both his agent Henry Willson (who gave him the temporary stage name of Dare Harris) and David O. Selznick with small roles in the Selznick pictures Since You Went Away (1944) and I'll Be Seeing You (1944).

He was drafted in 1944 into the United States Army, and saw service in the Philippines during the last days of World War II.

Columbia Pictures 

After the war, Derek had a small role in A Double Life (1947) when he was approached by Humphrey Bogart, who renamed him John Derek and cast him as Nick "Pretty Boy" Romano, an unrepentant killer, in Knock on Any Door (1949), a socially conscious melodrama directed by Nicholas Ray. Derek was recognized as a talented newcomer, "plainly an idol for the girls", as Bosley Crowther wrote in a review for The New York Times. The Los Angeles Times called him "a handsome hot-eyed newcomer who makes the case for this product of the city's slums—'live fast, die young and have a good looking corpse'—all too fascinating for everybody's comfort."

The film was made for Bogart's Santana company and released through Columbia Pictures, who signed Derek to a seven-year contract in April 1948. Derek followed it with a supporting role as the son of Broderick Crawford in All the King's Men (1949), the Best Picture Oscar winner for its year. In September 1950, he had his name formally changed to John Derek.

Columbia promoted him to lead roles, as the son of the deceased Robin Hood in Rogues of Sherwood Forest (1950) with Alan Hale Sr.; the Los Angeles Times called him a "slim and beautiful youth". He was meant to follow it with The Gainesville Circus, but it was never made.

Instead, Columbia put him in another swashbuckler, Mask of the Avenger (1951), then gave him a good dramatic role in a prestige film, Saturday's Hero (1951), as a college football player. The novel was bought specifically as a vehicle for Derek. He was in a crime noir, The Family Secret (1951), then reunited with Crawford in Scandal Sheet (1952).

Derek was borrowed by Republic Pictures for a war film, Thunderbirds (1952). He went back to Columbia for Prince of Pirates (1953), a swashbuckler for Sam Katzman; two Westerns, Ambush at Tomahawk Gap (1953), with John Hodiak and The Last Posse (1953) with Crawford. He was back with Hodiak for Mission Over Korea (1953), a Korean War film, then was again borrowed by Republic for Sea of Lost Ships (1953). He left Columbia in July 1953.

Freelance actor 
Derek made another film for Republic, The Outcast (1954), a Western. Walter Wanger used him for The Adventures of Hajji Baba (1954) released by 20th Century Fox, a surprise hit.

He had a showy role as John Wilkes Booth in Prince of Players (1955) at Fox, then was in a drama An Annapolis Story (1955) at Allied Artists.

Paramount 
In March 1954, Derek signed a long-term contract with Paramount. His first films for the studio were Run for Cover (1955), a Western with James Cagney and Nicholas Ray; and The Leather Saint (1956), a boxing film. He also appeared as Joshua in The Ten Commandments (1956). He wanted to make a film about Joaquin Murrieta but it was never made.

Derek travelled to Italy to appear in Pirate of the Half Moon (1957). He made a Western Fury at Showdown (1957) and a movie in Britain The Flesh Is Weak (1957). He supported Cornel Wilde in Omar Khayyam (1957), and starred in High Hell (1958). In Europe he was in Prisoner of the Volga (1959) and he played an Arab in Exodus (1960). He was in a TV series, Frontier Circus.

Director 
Derek disliked acting. He later said he "was never into it. If they'd given me the greatest role in the world it wouldn't have helped. I used to go to the directors of my films and say: 'I'm not an actor but I'll turn up on time and know my words.' In the 13 films I made I only ever did one take per scene. Directors never went for a second because they knew it'd be no different from the first. I never liked acting. Or my films. Maybe one, a cheap little Western called The Outcast. I liked that because I love horses. One of the troubles was I had a monotone voice which went even flatter when I tried to act. When I saw my first film Knock On Any Door in Italy I only liked it because my voice was dubbed by an Italian actor who had a lot of fire in his voice."

Derek appeared with his second wife, Ursula Andress, in Nightmare in the Sun (1965), which he co-produced. He turned to directing with a war film, Once Before I Die (1966), also with Andress.

He eventually quit acting. "In this town people think you must be nuts to do something like that. They can't believe you just didn't enjoy it."

He directed A Boy... a Girl (1969) with Dean Paul Martin, and Childish Things (1969) with his third wife, Linda Evans.

In 1973 he directed Bo Derek in Fantasies, which was not released until 1981. He made Love You (1979), a hardcore pornographic film which Bo produced. When the feature film 10 (1979) made Bo a star, Derek was able to find backing for Tarzan, the Ape Man (1981), which received mostly negative reviews; Roger Ebert called it "completely ridiculous" but added that it had a "certain disarming charm."

The Dereks intended to follow it with Eve and That Damned Apple; but when Universal delayed financing, they decided to make Bolero (1984) for Cannon, which was an unhappy experience for the Dereks. John's last film as director was Ghosts Can't Do It (1990).

An accomplished photographer, Derek photographed the last three of his four wives (at different times) for nude spreads in Playboy magazine.

Derek directed the music videos for Shania Twain's "Whose Bed Have Your Boots Been Under?" and "Any Man of Mine".

Personal life 

Derek married Turkish-born prima ballerina Pati Behrs Eristoff in 1948. They had a son, Russell Andre (1950–1999), who became paralyzed from the chest down in a 1969 motorcycle accident, and a daughter, Sean Catherine (born 1953), who later wrote a memoir titled Cast of Characters (1982) about her parents' dysfunctional relationship. Derek abandoned his wife and family in late summer 1955 after meeting 19-year-old aspiring Swiss actress Ursula Andress, who spoke almost no English when they met. He and Behrs were divorced in 1956.

In 1957, Derek married Andress in a quick Las Vegas ceremony. Five years later, her role in the James Bond film Dr. No launched her career. Derek ejected Andress from his California home in 1964 over rumors that she had been seeing actor Ron Ely. Andress returned to Europe, engaging in public affairs with costars John Richardson and Marcello Mastroianni before officially leaving Derek for Jean-Paul Belmondo in 1965. The pair divorced in 1966.

In September 1965, Derek became involved with American actress Linda Evans, who at the time was starring in television's The Big Valley. Several years into their relationship, Evans reduced her appearances on the show to spend more time with Derek, and financed his alimony and child support payments to Behrs, as he had quit acting to pursue photography and directing. They eloped in Mexico in 1968, with his daughter Sean as a witness.

In 1973 Derek, Evans, and 16-year-old high school dropout Mary Cathleen Collins (who would later be known as Bo Derek) traveled to the Greek island of Mykonos to make the film And Once Upon a Time (unreleased until 1981, under the title Fantasies). During filming, Derek and Collins began an affair. Evans returned to the United States and filed for divorce in 1974, but Derek and Collins stayed in Europe until she turned 18 in November of that year so that Derek could avoid statutory rape charges.

Collins became known to the public as Bo Derek following their marriage on June 10, 1976, and achieved international fame in 1979 with her role in the Blake Edwards film 10. They remained together until John died in 1998.

Derek suffered a heart attack in 1986, but completely recovered.

Derek had one granddaughter, Alyce Derek (born 1969), from Russell's marriage to Lynette Berry. He became a great-grandfather in 1996.

Death 
John Derek died on May 22, 1998 of cardiovascular disease in Santa Maria, California at the age of 71. His remains were cremated.

Filmography

As actor 
Features:

Since You Went Away (1944) as Minor Role (uncredited)
I'll Be Seeing You (1944) as Lt. Bruce
A Double Life (1947) as Police Stenographer (uncredited)
Knock on Any Door (1949) as Nick Romano
All the King's Men (1949) as Tom Stark
Rogues of Sherwood Forest (1950) as Robin, Earl of Huntington
Mask of the Avenger (1951) as Capt. Renato Dimorna
Saturday's Hero (1951) as Steve Novak
The Family Secret (1951) as David Clark
Scandal Sheet (1952) as Steve McCleary
Rainbow 'Round My Shoulders (1952) as John Derek (uncredited)
Thunderbirds (1952) as Lt. Gil Hackett
Prince of Pirates (1953) as Prince Roland
Ambush at Tomahawk Gap (1953) as Kid
The Last Posse (1953) as Jed Clayton
Mission Over Korea (1953) as Lt. Pete Barker
Sea of Lost Ships (1953) as G.R. 'Grad' Matthews
The Outcast (1954) as Jet Cosgrave
The Adventures of Hajji Baba (1954) as Hajji Baba
Prince of Players (1955) as John Wilkes Booth
An Annapolis Story (1955) as Anthony J. 'Tony' Scott
Run for Cover (1955) as Davey Bishop
The Leather Saint (1956) as Father Gil Allen
The Ten Commandments (1956) as Joshua
Massacre at Sand Creek (1956) (TV)
Fury at Showdown (1957) as Brock Mitchell
The Flesh Is Weak (1957) as Tony Giani
Omar Khayyam (1957) as Young Prince Malik
High Hell (1958) as Craig Rhodes
Pirate of the Half Moon (1958) as Nadir El Krim/Paul de Vellenera
Prisoner of the Volga (1959) as Alexej Orloff
Exodus (1960) as Taha
Nightmare in the Sun (1965) as Hitchhiker
Once Before I Die (1966) as Bailey (final film role)

Short Subjects:
The Nest (1943) as Boy Friend
Screen Snapshots: Hollywood Awards (1951) as Himself
Screen Snapshots: Meet Mr. Rhythm, Frankie Laine (1952) as Himself
Screen Snapshots: Hollywood's Mr. Movies (1952) as Himself
Screen Snapshots: Hollywood Stars to Remember (1954) as Himself

As filmmaker

References

Notes

Bibliography 

 Donnelley, Paul. Fade to Black: A Book of Movie Obituaries. London: Omnibus Press, 2005. .
 Maltin, Leonard. "John Derek". Leonard Maltin's Movie Encyclopedia. New York: Dutton, 1994. .
 Capua, Michelangelo.  John Derek. Actor, Director, Photographer.Jefferson, NC: McFarland, 2020.

External links 

 

1926 births
1998 deaths
Male actors from Los Angeles
American male film actors
20th-century American photographers
People from Santa Maria, California
Film directors from California
20th-century American male actors
Male Western (genre) film actors
United States Army personnel of World War II
Paramount Pictures contract players